Nassula is a genus of unicellular ciliates, belonging to the class Nassophorea.  Like other members of the class, Nassula possesses a basket-like feeding apparatus (nasse, or cyrtos) made up of cytopharyngeal rods (nematodesmata), which are themselves composed of closely packed microtubules. Nassula use this structure to ingest filamentous cyanobacteria, drawing individual strands of blue-green algae through the cytopharynx and into the body of the cell, where they are digested.  As the algae are broken down, they can take on a variety of bright colours, which give Nassula a distinctive, variegated appearance under the microscope.

Description

The body is ovoid to elongate, and uniformly ciliated, with a single macronucleus and a partial hypostomial frange (synhymenium) running from the left side of the cell to the oral aperture.   When food is scarce, members of the genus have the ability to become dormant by forming a microbial cyst.  Excystment can be induced by exposure to a medium inoculated with wild bacteria.

Reproduction

Nassula reproduce asexually, by fission.  During reproduction, the cell is divided transversally.  As in most ciliates (with the exception of the Karyorelictea) the macronucleus splits, during division, and the micronuclei also undergo mitosis.

While fission is an asexual process, it may be preceded by conjugation, during which compatible mating individuals come together and transfer genetic material across a cytoplasmic link.  In conjugation, the micronuclei of each cell undergo meiosis, and haploid micronuclei are then exchanged from one cell to the other.  After sexual exchange has occurred, both conjugants will divide by fission.

Video Gallery

Species list

References 

Nassophorea
Ciliate genera
Articles containing video clips
Taxa named by Christian Gottfried Ehrenberg